Lalmonirhat is a town and district headquarters of Lalmonirhat District in the division of Rangpur, Bangladesh.

References

Populated places in Rangpur Division